The Chief of the General Staff of Armed Forces is the highest-ranking military officer of in the Abkhazian Armed Forces, who is responsible for maintaining the operational command of the military.

List of Chiefs

See also
Abkhazian Armed Forces
Minister for Defence of Abkhazia

References

Military of Abkhazia
Abkhazia